Puka Hirka (Quechua puka red, hirka mountain, "red mountain", Hispanicized spelling Puca Jirca) is a  mountain in the Cordillera Negra in the Andes of Peru. It is situated in the Ancash Region, Huaraz Province, on the border of the districts of Cochabamba and Pariacoto, and in the Yungay Province, Shupluy District. It lies southwest of Willka Wayin.

References

External links 

Mountains of Peru
Mountains of Ancash Region